Bolehill may mean:

Bole hill, a place where lead was smelted in the open air;
Bolehill, Derbyshire, an area of Wirksworth.
Bolehill Recreation Ground, a public open space in Crookes, Sheffield.